Benign symmetric lipomatosis is a skin condition characterized by extensive symmetric fat deposits in the head, neck, and shoulder girdle area. The German surgeon Otto Wilhelm Madelung was the first to give a detailed description of the disorder. This condition is very rare, with an estimated incidence of 1 in 25,000, and affects males up to 30 times more frequently than females.

Cause
The cause of the disease remains unknown, but its incidence strongly correlates with alcohol use disorder; abstinence from alcohol prevents disease progression. Defects in the adrenergic-stimulated lipolysis and accumulation of embryological brown fat have also been reported. Cosmetic disfigurement due to the fat deposition in the cervicothoracic region results in a "pseudoathletic appearance", resembling the Italian statue Warrior of Capestrano and carvings of Queen of Punt (Egypt).

Treatment
Traditionally the treatment is mainly surgical, consisting of the removal of the lipomas, although recent study has proposed liposuction and phosphatidylcholine injection as possible alternatives.

Society
The appearance of people with the disease is depicted in:
Carvings of Queen of Punt (Egypt), as noted above
The Italian statue The Warrior of Capestrano, as noted above
Donna Leon's crime novel, Beastly Things (2012), wherein the protagonist investigates the murder of a man who had the condition, which Brunetti learns has a high incidence in Italy

See also 
 Lipomatosis
 List of skin conditions
 Madelung's deformity

References

External links 

Conditions of the subcutaneous fat
Rare diseases